Mysore–Chamarajanagar branch line is an Indian railway line from  to Chamarajanagar.

History 
It was inaugurated on 12 November 2008 when the Nanjangud–Chamarajanagar line was also opened to the public.

Construction 
The project cost . The gauge conversion work of the  stretch was completed.

Stations en route

Background
The only town between Mysore and Chamarajanagar is Nanjangud. All other railway stations cater to small villages or hamlets. There are six trains running on this route. Five of them are slow moving passenger trains.

References

Mysore railway division
5 ft 6 in gauge railways in India
Railway lines opened in 2008